The MacDonald–Todd House is an 1857 home in Hastings in the U.S. state of Minnesota. The Greek Revival-style house was built by A.W. MacDonald in the utopian town of Nininger when he relocated to Dakota County from New York. He came to become the managing editor of the Emigrant Aid Journal. The paper was owned by Lieutenant Governor Ignatius Donnelly, who also founded the community of Nininger. In 1866, the home was moved across the ice in the Mississippi River to its present location, by Irving Todd, who had bought it for $385.

References

1857 establishments in Minnesota Territory
Buildings and structures in Hastings, Minnesota
Houses in Dakota County, Minnesota
Houses on the National Register of Historic Places in Minnesota
National Register of Historic Places in Dakota County, Minnesota